Ravileh-ye Hasan (also Romanized as Ravīleh-ye Ḩasan; also known as Ravīleh, Ravīleh-ye Bālā, and Rovīleh) is a village in Sarqaleh Rural District, Ozgoleh District, Salas-e Babajani County, Kermanshah Province, Iran. At the 2006 census, its population was 50, in 8 families.

References 

Populated places in Salas-e Babajani County